The Athletic Federation of Bosnia and Herzegovina (Bosnian: Atletski savez Bosne i Hercegovine, ASBiH) is the governing body for the sport of athletics in Bosnia and Herzegovina. It is a member federation of the Olympic Committee of Bosnia and Herzegovina.

Affiliations 
World Athletics
European Athletic Association (EAA)
Olympic Committee of Bosnia and Herzegovina

National records 
ASBiH maintains the Bosnian records in athletics.

External links 
Official webpage 

Bosnia and Herzegovina
Athletics
National governing bodies for athletics
Athletics in Bosnia and Herzegovina